Emma Long Metropolitan Park is a large municipal park in northwest Austin, Texas (United States). The park is on the shores of Lake Austin and was originally called City Park. The park features open space, camp sites, boat ramps, picnic table sites and a designating swimming area.

In 1939, Civilian Conservation Corps Company 1805 that had just finished Bastrop State Park moved to the site to begin developing the tract of land into a municipal park. The company's primary work included seeding and sodding grass, planting trees, and protecting the bank of the lake from erosion. They built docks, piers and a boathouse.  They also built a wooden bath house and concession stand. These wooden structures burned and were replaced with stone structures that are still in use.

In 1984, the Austin City Council renamed the park after Emma Long, a former Austin City Council Member. Long was the first woman to serve on the council of a large city in Texas. She also served as the first woman Mayor Pro Tem from 1967-1969.

References

External links

Official website

Parks in Austin, Texas